Yusufzai is a Pashtun tribe from Afghanistan and Pakistan.

Yusufzai, Yousafzai, or Esapzai may also refer to:

Dialect
 Yusufzai dialect, a dialect of Pashto spoken in central, northern, and eastern Khyber Pakhtunkhwa, Pakistan and adjacent areas of Afghanistan

People
 Gaju Khan 
Sartor Faqir
Zabita Khan
Abdul Ghafoor Yusufzai, an Afghanistan footballer
 Abdul Latif Yousafzai, a Pakistani lawyer
 Ahmad Yusufzai, an Afghanistan hockey player
 Madhubala (1933–1969), Indian actress
 Malala Yousafzai (born 1997), a Pashtun female education activist and Nobel Peace Prize laureate
Abaseen Yousafzai
Malala Yousafzai
Ziauddin Yousafzai
Umra Khan
 Kalu khan 
 Malak Ahmad Khan Yousafzai
 Mohammed Sarwar Yusufzai, an Afghanistan footballer
 Mubaraka Yusufzai (born 16th century), empress consort of the Mughal Empire, wife of Babur
 Rahimullah Yusufzai (born 1954), Pakistani journalist
 Shaukat Ali Yousafzai (born 1963), Pakistani politician
 Abdul Hamid Khan Yusufzai (1845-1915), Bengali writer, politician and journalist
 Nowsher Ali Khan Yusufzai (1864-1924), Bengali writer and philanthropist
 Fakhar Zaman (cricketer)
 Munir Buneri, a Pashto poet
 Bakht Khan
 Bakht Jehan Khan
 Fazli Ghafoor
 Riaz Khan (politician)

See also
 Pashtun tribes
Urdu-language surnames